The Taiwan Times Village is a museum in Caotun Township, Nantou County, Taiwan.

Exhibitions
The museums exhibits the past life of Taiwan, which includes the life of Hakka, Hoklo, Taiwanese aborigines and veterans from Mainland China in different community blocks.

Transportation
The museum is accessible from Highway 3.

See also
 List of museums in Taiwan

References

External links

  

Caotun Township
Museums in Nantou County